Ragnar Guðmundsson (born 2 April 1968) is an Icelandic freestyle swimmer. He competed in two events at the 1988 Summer Olympics.

References

External links
 

1968 births
Living people
Ragnar Gudmundsson
Ragnar Gudmundsson
Swimmers at the 1988 Summer Olympics
Place of birth missing (living people)